David Shumate is an American poet.

Life
Shumate is the author of three books of prose poems published by the University of Pittsburgh Press: Kimonos in the Closet (2013), The Floating Bridge (2008) and High Water Mark (2004), winner of the 2003 Agnes Lynch Starrett Poetry Prize. 

Shumate's poetry has been anthologized in Good Poems for Hard Times, The Best American Poetry, and The Writer’s Almanac.  He was awarded an NEA Fellowship in poetry in 2009 and a Creative Renewal Fellowship by the Arts Council of Indianapolis in 2007.

Shumate is poet-in-residence emeritus at Marian University and a lecturer in Butler University’s MFA program. He lives in Zionsville, Indiana.

Awards
 2003 Agnes Lynch Starrett Poetry Prize
 2005 Best Books of Indiana competition
 2007 Creative Renewal Fellowship-Arts Council of Indianapolis
 2009 NEA Creative Writing Fellowship

Works
"Plum", AGNI
"In the Next America", Double Room
"Afternoon Nap", Arabesques Review
 
 
 Kimonos in the Closet, University of Pittsburgh Press, 2013

Anthologies

References

External links
"Response & Bio", Double Room
"Interview: David Shumate", Erc2008’s Weblog
"David Shumate", The Writer's Almanac

Year of birth missing (living people)
Living people
American male poets
People from Zionsville, Indiana
Agnes Lynch Starrett Poetry Prize winners